Zosteraeschna ellioti, the highland hawker or Elliot's hawker, is a species of dragonfly in the family Aeshnidae. It is found in Ethiopia, Kenya, Malawi, Mozambique, South Africa, Tanzania, Uganda, Zimbabwe, and possibly Burundi. Its natural habitats are subtropical or tropical moist montane forests, subtropical or tropical high-altitude shrubland, rivers, freshwater marshes, freshwater springs, and alpine wetlands.

References

Sources
 Clausnitzer, V. 2005.  Aeshna ellioti.   2006 IUCN Red List of Threatened Species.   Downloaded on 9 August 2007.

Aeshnidae
Insects described in 1896
Taxonomy articles created by Polbot
Odonata of Africa